The Golmud or Ge'ermu River is a river in Golmud County, Haixi Prefecture, Qinghai Province, China. It flows north from the Kunlun Mountains to Dabusun and (occasionally) West Dabusun Lakes in the central Qarhan Playa in the southeastern Qaidam Basin. The county seat Golmud lies along it.

Names
Golmud is a romanization of a Mongolian word meaning "rivers". Ge'ermu is the pinyin romanization of the Mandarin pronunciation of the same name's transcription into Chinese characters; it is sometimes misspelled Geermu. Ko-erh-mu was the same name romanized using the Wade–Giles system. The Wylie romanization of the Tibetan form of the name is Nagormo.

Geography

The Golmud flows north from the Kunlun Mountains, past Golmud, to a wide alluvial fan along the central part of the south side of the Qarhan Playa. For most of the year, only a small stream reaches Dabusun Lake but meltwater from the mountain glaciers sometimes floods into the other channels, spreading from West Dabusun Lake in the west, along the entire southern shore of Dabusun in the middle, and to Tuanjie Lake in the east.

See also
 List of rivers of China

References

Citations

Bibliography
 .

Rivers of China
Rivers of Qinghai
Haixi Mongol and Tibetan Autonomous Prefecture